At the 25th annual Four Hills Tournament, Jochen Danneberg became the third ski jumper after Helmut Recknagel and Bjørn Wirkola to defend his title. Crucial was a clear victory at the New Year's event in Garmisch-Partenkirchen. For the first time in ten years, there were four different winners at the single events.

Participating nations and athletes

Results

Oberstdorf
 Schattenbergschanze, Oberstdorf
30 December 1976

Garmisch-Partenkirchen
 Große Olympiaschanze, Garmisch-Partenkirchen
1 January 1977

Innsbruck
 Bergiselschanze, Innsbruck
4 January 1977

Bischofshofen
 Paul-Ausserleitner-Schanze, Bischofshofen
6 January 1977

After three events, the leading four were close together. Toni Innauer, leader Danneberg's closest rival, only placed 19th and fell back in the overall ranking. In spite of his win, Walter Steiner did not close the gap to Danneberg.

Final ranking

References

External links
 FIS website
 Four Hills Tournament web site

Four Hills Tournament
1976 in ski jumping
1977 in ski jumping